Su Maozhen (born 30 July 1972) is a Chinese football coach and former international player.

As a player, he spent his whole career with Shandong Luneng as a striker where he won several league and cups with them as well as being a regular for the Chinese national team, playing at the 2002 FIFA World Cup. After his retirement as a player he eventually moved into management where he started off as an assistant before becoming the head coach of the China under-20 national team.

Club career
Early on in his career, Su had two brief trial periods with Manchester United in the 1989–90 and 1991–92 seasons, during which he made a number of appearances for the Junior A team alongside future stars such as Ryan Giggs, David Beckham and Paul Scholes. Once Su returned to China and established himself as regular for Shandong Luneng, he then started his rise to prominence. This was first shown when he helped Shandong win the 1995 Chinese FA Cup and continued the following 1996 Chinese Jia-A League season when he was the league's top goalscorer with 13 league goals, despite Shandong only finishing in 5th in the league. By the 1999 league season, he had been made club captain, and led them to the league and cup double, resulting in him being named Chinese Footballer of the Year.

International career
Su Maozhen made his first senior international cap against Saudi Arabia on 23 January 1994 in a 1–0 defeat. However, he struggled to make much of an impact and was sidelined until he became a regular for Shandong and win the 1995 Chinese FA Cup with them. Given another chance to make an impression for his country he was selected for the squad to play against Macau for China's 1996 AFC Asian Cup qualification campaign where on 30 January 1996 he scored his debut goal in a 7–1 victory. After that game he quickly started to a regular for his country and was included in the squads that reached the quarter-finals in the 1996 AFC Asian Cup and then semi-finals of the 2000 AFC Asian Cup while also being an integral member of the squad that qualified for 2002 FIFA World Cup. During the tournament he only made one appearance against Costa Rica and once the World Cup campaign finished Su soon retired from international football.

International goals

Management career
In 2006, Su graduated from Salford Business School, University of Salford in the United Kingdom, having completed a master's degree in Management. In 2006 he returned to his former club, Shandong Luneng where he was offered their under-17 management position. In November 2006, he was appointed as Assistant Manager of the Chinese Olympic football team by the Chinese Football Association (CFA) in their preparations for the 2008 Beijing Games. Once the tournament finished he was offered the chance to become the Head coach of the Chinese under-20 team. His first assignment was to qualify for the 2010 AFC U-19 Championship, which he achieved by winning all of the qualifying games while during the tournament China reached the quarter-finals.

Honours

Player
Shandong Luneng
Chinese Jia-A League: 1999
Chinese FA Cup: 1995, 1999

References

External links
 World Cup footballer graduates from Salford
 Salford graduate appointed as Olympic football coach
 BBC Sport World Cup 2002 profile
 

1972 births
Chinese footballers
Footballers from Qingdao
Association football forwards
Shandong Taishan F.C. players
China international footballers
2002 FIFA World Cup players
1996 AFC Asian Cup players
2000 AFC Asian Cup players
Chinese football managers
Alumni of the University of Salford
Qingdao Hainiu F.C. (1990) managers
Qingdao F.C. managers
Living people